The United States recognized the Mutawakkilite Kingdom of Yemen in 1946 and commissioned its first ambassador, J. Rives Childs to the Kingdom of Yemen on August 22, 1946. A diplomatic legation was established in Ta'izz. At that time the ambassador to Saudi Arabia was concurrently commissioned to Yemen while resident in Jeddah, Saudi Arabia.

Following a coup d'état in North Yemen in 1962, the nation was renamed Yemen Arab Republic. A period of civil war ensued for the next five years. The United States maintained diplomatic relations with the Kingdom but no ambassador was accredited to the nation. A series of chargés d'affaires maintained the legation during that period. Also during that time, the legation in Ta'izz was raised to embassy status on January 28, 1963 and the embassy was transferred to San'a in 1966.

The Yemen Arab Republic severed relations with the United States June 7, 1967. A U.S. Interests Section was established in the Italian Embassy on April 10, 1970. The embassy in San'a was re-established on July 1, 1972. The first Ambassador Extraordinary and Plenipotentiary, William R. Crawford, Jr., was appointed on October 12, 1972.

On May 22, 1990, the Yemen Arab Republic and the People's Democratic Republic of Yemen (South Yemen) announced that they were forming a united Republic of Yemen.

For subsequent ambassadors to the Republic of Yemen, see United States Ambassador to Yemen.

For ambassadors to South Yemen, see United States Ambassador to South Yemen.

Ambassadors

Note: Until 1963 the embassy had the status of legation rather than embassy and the title of the ambassador was Envoy Extraordinary and Minister Plenipotentiary.
Note: Until 1957 the envoy was concurrently commissioned to the Kingdom of Yemen and Saudi Arabia, while resident at Jeddah.
J. Rives Childs – Career FSO
Title: Envoy Extraordinary and Minister Plenipotentiary
Appointed: August 22, 1946
Presented credentials: September 30, 1946
Terminated mission: Left Jeddah, July 21, 1950
Raymond A. Hare – Career FSO
Title: Envoy Extraordinary and Minister Plenipotentiary
Appointed: September 20, 1950
Presented credentials: July 22, 1951
Terminated mission: Left Jeddah, July 8, 1953
George Wadsworth – Career FSO
Title: Envoy Extraordinary and Minister Plenipotentiary
Appointed: October 21, 1953
Presented credentials: September 13, 1954
Terminated mission: Left Jeddah, January 1, 1958
Note: In 1957 or 1958 (records unclear), the U.S. ambassador to Egypt was concurrently commissioned to Yemen while resident at Cairo.
Donald R. Heath – Career FSO
Title: Envoy Extraordinary and Minister Plenipotentiary
Appointed: November 27, 1957
Presented credentials: —
Terminated mission: —
Raymond A. Hare – Career FSO
Title: Envoy Extraordinary and Minister Plenipotentiary
Appointed: February 16, 1959
Presented credentials: March 11, 1959
Terminated mission: Left Cairo, December 18, 1959
G. Frederick Reinhardt – Career FSO
Title: Envoy Extraordinary and Minister Plenipotentiary
Appointed: January 27, 1960
Presented credentials: April 28, 1960
Terminated mission: Left Cairo, May 6, 1961
Parker T. Hart – Career FSO
Title: Envoy Extraordinary and Minister Plenipotentiary
Appointed: May 20, 1961
Presented credentials: October 1, 1961
Terminated mission: Appointment terminated, September 27, 1962
Notes:
In 1962–1967 during a period of civil war in North Yemen, there was no ambassador or envoy commissioned to the Yemen Arab Republic. The Chargés d'Affaires ad interim 1962–1967 were:
Robert Stookey (1963)
James N. Cortada (February 1963–August 1964)
Lee Dinsmore (August 1964–June 1967)
The U.S. Legation was raised to embassy status on January 28, 1963.
The embassy was moved to San'a in 1966.
The Yemen Arab Republic severed diplomatic relations with the United States June 7, 1967 and all U.S. diplomatic personnel were withdrawn.
A U.S. Interest Section was established in the Italian Embassy on April 10, 1970. Principal Officers were David W. McClintock (April 1970–February 1972) and Robert A. Stein (February–July 1972).
The embassy in San'a was re-established on July 1, 1972, with Robert A. Stein as Chargé d'Affaires ad interim.
From 1972 the ambassador had the rank of Ambassador Extraordinary and Plenipotentiary and was commissioned to the Yemen Arab Republic.
William R. Crawford Jr. – Career FSO
Title: Ambassador Extraordinary and Plenipotentiary
Appointed: October 12, 1972
Presented credentials: December 19, 1972
Terminated mission: Left post July 6, 1974
Thomas J. Scotes – Career FSO
Title: Ambassador Extraordinary and Plenipotentiary
Appointed: December 20, 1974
Presented credentials: January 21, 1975
Terminated mission: Left post April 24, 1978
George M. Lane – Career FSO
Title: Ambassador Extraordinary and Plenipotentiary
Appointed: August 11, 1978
Presented credentials: October 5, 1978
Terminated mission: Left post July 4, 1981
David E. Zweifel – Career FSO
Title: Ambassador Extraordinary and Plenipotentiary
Appointed: September 28, 1981
Presented credentials: October 24, 1981
Terminated mission: Left post June 20, 1984
William Arthur Rugh – Career FSO
Title: Ambassador Extraordinary and Plenipotentiary
Appointed: September 21, 1984
Presented credentials: October 28, 1984
Terminated mission: Left post July 4, 1987
Note: The post was vacant July 1987–August 1988. Theodore H. Kattouf served as Chargé d'Affaires ad interim in that interval.
Charles Franklin Dunbar – Career FSO
Title: Ambassador Extraordinary and Plenipotentiary
Appointed: June 16, 1988
Presented credentials: August 14, 1988
Terminated mission: Left post June 13, 1991

On May 22, 1990, the Yemen Arab Republic and the People's Democratic Republic of Yemen united to form the "Republic of Yemen." For ambassadors to the Republic of Yemen, see United States Ambassador to Yemen.

See also
Yemen Arab Republic
History of Yemen

Notes

References
U.S. Dep’t of State: Background Notes on Yemen
U.S. Dep’t of State: U.S. Ambassadors to Yemen

Yemen, North
 
United States
Ambassadors
United States–Yemen relations